Thomas Morell (18 March 1703 – 19 February 1784) was an English librettist, classical scholar, and printer.

Life
He was born in Eton, Berkshire and educated at Eton College and King's College, Cambridge (BA, 1726, MA, 1730 and DD, 1743). 

He was a Fellow of the Society of Antiquaries of London and in 1768 was elected a Fellow of the Royal Society as a "Rector of Buckland in Hertfordshire, Author of the Greek Thesaurus lately published, and Fellow of the Society of Antiquaries of London, a Gentleman well skilled in Natural History and every branch of Polite Literature".

He was appointed Garrison Chaplain at Portsmouth barracks in 1775.

Morell wrote the longest and most detailed surviving account of collaboration with Handel.

He died in 1784 and was buried in Chiswick, London.

Librettos
He is best known as the librettist of the following of George Frideric Handel's oratorios:
Judas Maccabaeus (1747).
Joshua (1747).
Alexander Balus (1748).
Theodora (1750).
The Choice of Hercules (1750). Uncertain if Morell was the librettist.
Jephtha (1752).
The Triumph of Time and Truth (1757). Morell was probably the librettist.

References

1703 births
1784 deaths
People educated at Eton College
Alumni of King's College, Cambridge
Morell
Fellows of the Society of Antiquaries of London
Fellows of the Royal Society